St Marys Senior High School is a government-funded co-educational dual modality partially academically selective and comprehensive post-compulsory secondary day school, located in St Marys, a suburb in western Sydney, New South Wales, Australia.

Established in 1989, the school is the first New South Wales Department of Education senior high school and currently caters for approximately 900 students in Year 11 and Year 12.

History

St Marys Senior High School was the first NSW Government senior high school. It was established in 1989 on the site of the comprehensive high school which first opened in 1956 (formerly known as St Marys High School), in the old Munitions area of North St. Marys in approximately 1952.

Overview 

St Marys Senior High School is registered and accredited with the New South Wales Board of Studies, and follows the mandated curriculum for Years 11 and 12.

The large number of Higher School Certificate (HSC) students means that almost the full range of Board HSC subjects, as well as a number of Joint School – TAFE courses and other courses designed to meet students' special needs and interests are provided.

In 2008, a St Marys Senior High School student was awarded first place in the Society and Culture HSC exam. In the 2008 HSC exams, St Marys Senior High School had 5 students achieve recognition on the Board of Studies All Rounders List.

Notable alumni
 Rebecca Leeathlete; Australian representative to the 2012 Olympics
 Paige Hadley- netballer

See also

 List of government schools in New South Wales
 List of selective high schools in New South Wales

References

External links 
 St Marys Senior High School website

1989 establishments in Australia
Public high schools in Sydney
Educational institutions established in 1989
St Marys, New South Wales
Selective schools in New South Wales